César Cercado (born 23 March 1989 in Puebla, México) is a former professional footballer. Cercado is a defender who last played for Tlaxcala in Liga de Expansión MX.

Club career
At the age of 14, he joined the Lobos de la BUAP club, which represents the Meritorious Autonomous University of Puebla in the Promotion League. He has played there between 2006 and 2019. and then in 2011 transferred to Puebla F.C. on a 6-month loan deal. In 2019, Lobos BUAP was acquired by F.C. Juárez, after this, Cercado signed for Alebrijes de Oaxaca.

References

External links

1989 births
Living people
Footballers from Puebla
Association football defenders
Lobos BUAP footballers
Club Puebla players
Mexican footballers